Abayita Ababiri, sometimes spelled Abaita Ababiri, is a neighborhood in Uganda.

Location
Abayita Ababiri is located in Kyaddondo South Constituency, Wakiso District, Central Uganda. It lies along the old Entebbe-Kampala Road, and is the beginning of the new Entebbe-Kampala Highway, currently under construction. The coordinates of Abayita Ababiri are:0° 05' 36.00"N, 32° 30' 0.00"E (Latitude:0.093334; Longitude:32.500000).

Overview
Abayita Ababiri has grown from a small trading center in the middle of the 20th century to bustling urban center in the early 21st century. The neighbourhood now boasts of supermarkets, banks, petrol stations, internet cafes and schools. The new Entebbe-Kampala Highway, currently under construction joins the old Entebbe-Kampala Road, in the neighborhood.

Population
, the population of Abayita Ababiri is not publicly known.

Points of interest
The following points of interest lie in Abayita Ababiri or near the limits of the neighborhood:

 The offices of Abayita Ababiri Town Council
 A branch of Barclays Bank
 A branch of Crane Bank
 A bayita Ababiri Central Market
 The Kampala-Entebbe Highway - The highway joins the old Entebbe-Kampala Road in Abayita Ababiri
 The main campus of Nkumba University is located to the immediate northeast of Abayita Ababiri.

External links
SOS Children's Village at Abayita Ababiri (Entebbe)

See also

 Entebbe-Kampala Highway
 Wakiso District
 Central Region, Uganda

References

Populated places in Central Region, Uganda
Wakiso District